Charles Russell Metcalfe (1904–1991) was an English botanist and explorer, who undertook botanical collecting expeditions in west Cameroon.

Selected publications

Honours 
 1971: Linnean Medal

Eponymy 
Genera
 (Poaceae) Metcalfia Conert

References

External links 

1904 births
1991 deaths
English botanists
English anatomists
Botanists active in Kew Gardens
Linnean Medallists
Alumni of the University of Cambridge
Members of the Order of the British Empire